Isoetes ecuadoriensis is a species of plant in the family Isoetaceae. It is endemic to Ecuador.  Its natural habitats are subtropical or tropical high-altitude grassland and alpine wetlands. It is threatened by habitat loss.

References

ecuadoriensis
Flora of Ecuador
Vulnerable plants
Taxonomy articles created by Polbot